Six vessels of the Royal Navy have been named HMS Boston:

, a 32-gun fifth rate built in America in 1692 and presented by the citizens of Boston to the Royal Navy in 1694.  The ship was captured in the Atlantic by French forces on 4 January 1695. 
, a 24-gun sixth rate launched at Boston, Massachusetts in 1748 and broken up in 1752.
The ship was sold in 1757.
, a 32-gun fifth rate launched at Rotherhithe in May 1762 and broken up in 1811.
, a 6-gun schooner constructed at Navy Island in 1764 for service on the Canadian Lakes.  It was burnt in 1768.
, a 28 gun ship captured from the Americans in 1776, refitted and given to Captain William Duddingston
, a turbine-powered  launched at Troon, Scotland in December 1940 and sold for scrap in January 1948.

References

Royal Navy ship names